The St. Johns and Halifax Railway was a  narrow gauge railroad incorporated on December 12, 1881, under the general incorporation laws of Florida.  Its plan was to build a railroad from Rollestown in Putnam County on the St. Johns River, to a point on the Halifax River in Volusia County at or near New Britain (known as Ormond Beach today).  The distance of the line was 51.99 miles, but 1.4 miles of the line was eventually abandoned.  Florida state law chapter 3650, approved February 12, 1885, assigned it land grants.

On October 1, 1888, the property of the St. Johns and Halifax Railway was conveyed to the St. Johns & Halifax River Railway, which was incorporated a few days later on October 11, 1888. On January 1, 1893, the line was acquired by the Florida East Coast Railway.

References

3 ft gauge railways in the United States
Defunct Florida railroads
Predecessors of the Florida East Coast Railway
Railway companies established in 1881
Railway companies disestablished in 1888
Narrow gauge railroads in Florida
1881 establishments in Florida